Oreste Riva (21 July 1860 – 31 December 1936) was an Italian composer. In 1920 he won a silver medal in the art competitions of the Olympic Games for his "Marcia trionfale" ("Triumphal March").

References

External links
 profile

Bibliography
Marino Anesa: Dizionario della musica italian per banda - Biografie dei compositori e catalogo delle opere dal 1800 al 1945, 1993, 514 pp.
Paul E. Bierley, William H. Rehrig: The heritage encyclopedia of band music: composers and their music, Westerville, Ohio: Integrity Press, 1991 
Carlo Schmidl: Dizionario universale dei musicisti: Supplemento, Milan: Sonzogno, 1938, 806 pp.
Franz Stieger: Opernlexikon - Teil II: Komponisten. 1, Band A-F, Tutzing: Hans Schneider, 1975–1983, 371 pp. 
Franz Stieger: Opernlexikon - Teil II: Komponisten. 2, Band G-M, Tutzing: Hans Schneider, 1975–1983, 373-772 pp. 
Wolfgang Suppan, Armin Suppan: Das Neue Lexikon des Blasmusikwesens, 4th edn., Freiburg-Tiengen, Blasmusikverlag Schulz GmbH, 1994 

1860 births
1936 deaths
Italian composers
Italian male composers
Olympic silver medalists in art competitions
Medalists at the 1920 Summer Olympics
Olympic competitors in art competitions
Art competitors at the 1920 Summer Olympics